Chromolaena misella is a Mexican species of flowering shrub in the family Asteraceae. It is native to the State of Jalisco in western Mexico.

Chromolaena misella is a shrub up to 80 cm (32 inches) tall. Leaves are opposite, 3-nerved, up to 12 cm long. Flower heads are produced in groups of 2-5 heads, with blue disc florets but no ray florets.

References

misella
Flora of Jalisco
Plants described in 1972